Lubieszynek  is a village located in the administrative district of Gmina Nowa Karczma within Kościerzyna County, Pomeranian Voivodeship in northern Poland.

For details of the history of the region, see History of Pomerania.

This village has a population of 163.

References

Lubieszynek